The 2023 Census of Nigeria will be a detailed enumeration of the Nigerian population that will be the fifth national census in the country since Independence. It will be the first national census held since 2006. Over 190 Billion Naira (₦) has been allocated for the exercise. A pilot census will be held in July 2022 to get ready for the final census in 2023. The help of the Nigeria Security and Civil Defence Corps (NSCDC) has been requested by the Chairman of the National Population Commission (NPC) in order to provide security. The census will also be notable for being the first digital census in Nigeria's history.

See also
Demographics of Nigeria

References

Demographics of Nigeria
2023 in Nigeria
Nigeria